Florian Lakat (born 12 November 1995) is a French tennis player.

Lakat has a career high ATP singles ranking of 680 achieved on 19 March 2018. He also has a career high doubles ranking of 252 achieved on 16 April 2018.

Lakat has won 1 ATP Challenger doubles title at the 2017 Tiburon Challenger.

Lakat played college tennis at Mississippi State University and the University of California, Berkeley.

Tour titles

Doubles

References

External links
 
 

1995 births
Living people
French male tennis players
Mississippi State Bulldogs tennis players
California Golden Bears men's tennis players
Tennis players from Paris
French people of Hungarian descent